Orindiúva is a municipality in the state of São Paulo, Brazil. The population is 7,194 (2020 est.) in an area of 248.1 km².

Orindiúva belongs to the Mesoregion of São José do Rio Preto.

References

Municipalities in São Paulo (state)